Erysimum arenicola, the Cascade wallflower, is a plant species native to British Columbia, Washington and Oregon. It is found at high elevations from 900 to 2200 m in the Cascade and Olympic Mountains as well as on Vancouver Island.

Erysimum arenicola is a perennial herb up to 30 cm tall. Leaves are narrow, up to 8 cm long. Flowers are yellow, borne in a raceme. Fruits are narrow and elongated, up to 10 cm long, straight or twisted, strongly torulose (= much narrower in between seeds).

References

External links

arenicola
Flora of British Columbia
Flora of Oregon
Flora of Washington (state)
Flora without expected TNC conservation status